The Prime Minister's Prizes for Science are annual Australian awards for outstanding achievements in scientific research, innovation, and teaching. The prizes have been awarded since 2000, when they replaced the Australia Prize for science.

The major awards are the Prime Minister's Prize for Science, regarded as the national award for the advancement of knowledge through science, and the Prime Minister's Prize for Innovation (created in 2015), as the national award for  translation of science into commercial outcomes. In 2016, an additional Prize for New Innovators was also created.

The Frank Fenner Prize for Life Scientist of the Year (previously known as the Science Minister's Prize for Science) and the Malcolm McIntosh Prize for Physical Scientist of the Year were also created in 2000. Prizes for excellence in science teaching at primary and secondary schools were added in 2002.

Awards

Prime Minister's Prize for Science
The recipient(s) of this prize can be an individual or jointly up to four individuals, if the achievement is the result of a collaborative team effort. The recipient receives AUD 250,000, an embossed solid gold medallion and lapel pin.

Prizewinners
Source:Department of Industry, Innovation and Science
2022 – Trevor McDougall For his discovery of four new ocean mixing processes and his work to define the thermodynamic properties of seawater
2021 – Edward C. Holmes For his transformative role in the scientific response to COVID-19
2020 – David McClelland, Susan Scott, Peter Veitch and David Blair (OzGrav collaboration) For critical contributions to the first direct detection of gravitational waves 
2019 – Cheryl Praeger For her fundamental work in group theory and combinatorics
2018 – Kurt Lambeck For transforming our understanding of our living planet
2017 – Jenny Graves For her pioneering investigations of the genetics of sex
2016 – Richard Shine For his work using evolutionary principles to address conservation challenges
2015 – Graham Farquhar For modelling photosynthesis, the world’s most important biological reaction
2014 – Sam Berkovic and Ingrid Scheffer jointly For their contribution to the study of epilepsy, its diagnosis, management and treatment
2013 – Terry Speed For his contribution to making sense of genomics and related technologies (using statistics)
2012 – Ken Freeman For his founding of [...] galactic archaeology
2011 – Dr. Ezio Rizzardo and David Solomon For their role in revolutionizing polymer science
2010 – John Shine For his scientific research and research leadership
2009 – John O'Sullivan For his achievements in astronomy and wireless technologies
2008 – Ian Frazer For his creation of the first vaccine designed to protect against a cancer
2007 – Peter Waterhouse and Ming-Bo Wang For their discovery of how to silence genes in plants
2006 – Mandyam Veerambudi Srinivasan For research  that has revealed the working of the insect mind, and helped redefine robotics research
2005 – David Boger For a lifetime of pioneering work in fluid mechanics
2004 – Graeme Clark For the discoveries which led to the bionic ear
2003 – Jacques Miller For discovery of the role of the thymus in the immune system; and discovery that mammals have two types of white bloods cells
2002 – Frank Fenner (deceased) For eradication of smallpox, and the trialling and release of the rabbit myxoma virus
2001 – Donald Metcalf For discovery and development of hormones called “colony stimulating factors” which stimulate the formation of white blood cells
2000 – Jim Peacock and Liz Dennis For discovery of the Flowering Switch Gene, a key gene in determining when plants end their vegetative growth phase and begin flowering

Prime Minister's Prize for Innovation
The recipient(s) of this prize can be an individual or jointly up to four individuals, if the commercialisation is the result of a collaborative team effort. The recipient receives AUD 250,000, an embossed solid gold medallion and lapel pin. 
Prizewinners
Source:Department of Industry, Innovation and Science
2022 – Alison Todd and Elisa Mokany
2022 –  Nick Cutmore, James Tickner and Dirk Treasure at Chrysos Corporation and CSIRO For the commercialisation of PhotonAssay
2021 – Anthony Steven Weiss For his pioneering research and commercialisation of synthetic tropoelastin-based biomaterials, which can accelerate and improve the repair of human tissue
2020 – Thomas Maschmeyer – His work on translating fundamental research into two pioneering technologies
2019 – The Walter and Eliza Hall Institute team For the development of the leukemia drug venetoclax
2018 – Dr Simon Poole, Andrew Bartos, Dr Glenn Baxter and Dr Steven Frisken For creating and commercialising technologies that underpin the global internet
2017 – Eric Reynolds For inventing and commercialising Recaldent
2016 – Michael Aitken For creating and commercialising tools that are making markets fair and efficient
2015 – Graeme Jameson For his development of floatation technologies that have added billions of dollars to the value of Australia’s mineral and energy industries

Prize for New Innovators
This prize is awarded only to an individual and the recipient receives AUD 50 000, a silver medallion and lapel pin.

Prizewinners
Source:Department of Industry, Innovation and Science
2022 – Brett Hallam
2022 – Pip Karoly
2021 – Michael Bowen For his work in the discovery and development of KNX100
2020 – Justin Chalker For inventing a new class of polymers
2019 – Dr Luke Campbell For inventing the nuraphone, headphones that adapt to an individual's unique sense of hearing
2018 – Dr Geoff Rogers For creating and commercialising his pioneering biomedical engineering
2016 – Colin Hall For his contribution to a new manufacturing technology

Frank Fenner Prize for Life Scientist of the Year
This award is for early to mid-career scientists, not more than ten years or full-time equivalent past the award of their highest degree (e.g. Master's or PhD), working in the life sciences. The recipient receives $50,000, a medal and a lapel pin.
Prizewinners
2022 – Si Ming Man
2021 – Sherene Loi For translating scientific findings into innovative treatments that can improve the survival of breast cancer patients in Australia and around the world
2020 – Mark Dawson For pioneering research in the field of epigenetics and its impact on human health and disease
2019 – Laura Mackay For her leadership in the field of immunological memory
2018 – Lee Berger For solving the global mystery of disappearing frogs and challenging paradigms about wildlife health
2017 – Jian Yang For creating ways to understand inherited traits and the human genome
2016 – Kerrie Wilson  For optimising the global allocation of scarce conservation resources
2015 – Jane Elith For her contributions to environmental management worldwide
2014 – Ryan Lister For his contribution to the understanding of gene regulation and its potential ability to change agriculture and the treatment of disease and mental health
2013 – Angela Moles For transforming our understanding of the ecosystems and overturning some of the dogmas of ecology
2012 – Mark Shackleton For identifying and isolating stem cells in the female mammary gland to develop a fully functional breast
2011 – Min Chen For her contribution to our knowledge of chlorophyll and cyanobacteria
2010 – Benjamin Kile For his achievements in molecular genetics
2009 – Michael Cowley For his contribution to our understanding of metabolism and obesity
2008 – Carola Vinuesa For her contributions to immunology
2007 – Elizabeth (Beth) Fulton For her leadership in mathematics and ecosystem modeling
2006 – James Whisstock For his discoveries of novel serpins, and his research leadership in protein biology
2005 – Harvey Millar For his leadership in plant biochemistry
2004 – Jamie Rossjohn For his leadership in structural biology and X-ray crystallography
2003 – Christopher Helliwell For isolating the genes that control the biosynthesis of gibberellin, a plant hormone that controls plant growth
2002 – Joel Mackay For his discovery of new methods of controlling DNA transcription to repair malfunctioning genes
2001 – Bostjan Kobe For research contributions that have increased our understanding of protein interaction and cellular processes
2000 – Una M. Ryan For DNA detection and characterisation methods for the parasites Cryptosporidium and Giardia

Malcolm McIntosh Prize for Physical Scientist of the Year
This award is for early to mid-career scientists, not more than ten years or full-time equivalent past the award of their highest degree (e.g. Master's or PhD), working in the physical sciences. The recipient receives $50,000, a medal and a lapel pin.
Prizewinners
2022 – Adele Morrison
2021 – Keith Bannister For his pioneering research into fast radio bursts
2020 –  Xiaojing Hao For her research into solar cells made from 'sulphide kesterite'''
2019 – Elizabeth New For pioneering new chemical imaging tools to observe healthy and diseased cells2018 – Jack Clegg For creating flexible crystals and new separation technologies2017 – Dayong Jin For creating new technologies to image the processes of life2016 – Richard Payne For his revolutionary drug development technologies2015 – Cyrille Boyer For his contribution to polymer science, nanotechnology and nanomedicine2014 – Matthew Hill For his work in the development of metal-organic frameworks for practical industrial applications2013 – Andrea Morello For intellectual leadership in developing a trillion-dollar global industry, the building blocks of a quantum computer, a working prototype silicon component to make quantum computing possible2012 – Eric May For significant research in the field of natural gas processing2011 – Stuart Wyithe For his work on the physics of the formation of the Universe2010 – Katherine Trinajstic For her early career achievements in palaeontology2009 – Amanda Barnard For her achievements in modelling nanoparticles2008 – Tanya Monro For her leadership in photonics2007 – Mark Cassidy For his leadership in offshore civil engineering2006 – Naomi McClure-Griffiths For her insight into the structure of our galaxy, and her research leadership2005 – Cameron Kepert For his leadership in chemistry and molecular nanoscience2004 – Ben Eggleton For pioneering research in photonics and optical physics2003 – Howard Wiseman For advancing our understanding of the physical effect of observations in quantum system monitoring and measurement2002 – Marcela Bilek For the design and fabrication of plasma processing devices and new materials using thin film lamination technology2001 – Peter Bartlett For his research into artificial intelligence and discoveries in the area of machine learning and information processing2000 – Brian Schmidt For his leadership of an international team that uncovered evidence that the universe was expanding at an accelerating rate.''

Prime Minister's Prize for Excellence in Science Teaching in Primary Schools

This prize is awarded to an individual who has made a significant contribution to teaching science at a primary school level. The recipient is awarded $50,000,a medal and lapel pin.
Department of Industry, Innovation and Science
Prizewinners
2021 – Megan Hayes (Qld)
2020 – Sarah Fletcher (ACT)
2019 – Sarah Finney (SA)
2018 – Brett Crawford (Qld)
2017 – Neil Bramsen (NSW)
2016 – Gary Tilley (NSW)
2015 – Rebecca Johnson (Qld)
2014 – Brian Schiller (SA)
2013 – Richard Johnson (WA)
2012 – Michael van der Ploeg (Tas)
2011 – Brooke Topelberg (WA)
2010 – Matthew McCloskey (NSW)
2009 – Allan Whittome (WA)
2008 – Bronwyn Mart (SA)
2007 – Cheryl Capra (Qld)
2006 – Marjorie Colvill (Tas)
2005 – Mark Merritt (WA)
2004 – Alwyn Powell (Qld)
2003 – Sarah Tennant (NSW)
2002 – Marianne Nicholas (SA)

Prime Minister's Prize for Excellence in Science Teaching in Secondary Schools
This prize is awarded to an individual who has made a significant contribution to teaching science at a secondary school level. The recipient is awarded $50,000, a medal and lapel pin. Department of Industry, Innovation and Science

Prizewinners
2021 – Scott Graham (NSW)
2020 – Darren Hamley (WA)
2019 – Samantha Moyle (SA)
2018 – Scott Sleap (NSW)
2017 – Brett McKay (NSW)
2016 – Suzy Urbaniak (WA)
2015 – Ken Silburn (NSW)
2014 – Geoff McNamara (ACT)
2013 – Sarah Chapman (Qld)
2012 – Anita Trenwith (SA)
2011 – Jane Wright (SA)
2010 – Debra Smith (Qld)
2009 – Len Altman (SA)
2008 – Clay Reid (SA)
2007 – Francesca Calati (Vic)
2006 – Anna Davis (NSW)
2005 – Mike Roach (SA)
2004 – Mark Butler (NSW)
2003 – Pam Garnett (WA)
2002 – Ruth Dircks (NSW)

History of the Prime Minister's Prizes for Science
The Australia Prize was the predecessor award to the Prime Minister's Prizes for Science and was awarded annually from 1990 to 1999 (although no award was made in 1991). It was an international award, aimed at a worldwide audience for an outstanding specific achievement in a selected area of science and technology promoting human welfare. It achieved widespread recognition by individuals and organisations throughout the world, receiving nominations from 18 countries.

The Government awarded the Australia Prize to both Australian and international scientists. Of the 28 recipients, 18 were Australian, demonstrating Australia's strong international standing in many scientific fields.

The Australia Prize was replaced in 2000 by the current set of prizes.

Australia Prize recipients
1999 – Energy science and technology theme – Martin A. Green and Stuart R. Wenham
1998 – Molecular science theme – Elizabeth Blackburn, Suzanne Cory, Alec Jeffreys and Grant Sutherland
1997 – Telecommunications theme- Allan Snyder, Rodney Tucker and Gottfried Ungerboeck
1996 – Pharmaceutical design theme – Paul Janssen, Graeme Laver, Peter Colman and Mark von Itzstein 
1995 – Remote sensing theme – Kenneth G. McCracken, Andrew Green, Jonathon Huntington, Richard Moore 
1994 – Sustainable land management theme – Gene Likens 
1993 – Sensory perception theme – Horace Barlow, Peter Bishop and Vernon Mountcastle 
1992 – Mining or processing of mineral resources theme – John Watt, Brian Sowerby, Nicholas Cutmore and Jim Howarth 
1991 – No Awards presented 
1990 – Agriculture or the environment theme – Allen Kerr, Eugene Nester and Jeff Schell

See also 

 List of general science and technology awards

References

External links
An overview of the Prime Minister's Prizes for Science

Australian science and technology awards
Teacher awards
Awards established in 2000
Early career awards
Prime Minister of Australia
Science and technology in Australia